Propositions 94, 95, 96, and 97 were Californian ballot propositions that sought to expand the scope of Native American gambling enterprises in California. All four propositions were approved by voters during elections on February 5, 2008

Proposals 
All propositions sought to expand Indian Gaming Compacts with individual tribes. Proposition 94 affected the Pechanga Band of Luiseño Mission Indians, Proposition 95 affected the Morongo Band of Mission Indians, Proposition 96 affected the Sycuan Band of the Kumeyaay Nation, Proposition 97 affected the Agua Caliente Band of Cahuilla Indians.

All the propositions allowed the tribes to operate additional slot machines and changed the environmental impact assessment procedures. The propositions also made the tribes pay additional deposits into the state General Fund.

Results

References

94, 95, 96, and 97